Waldstein may refer to:
Waldstein (mountain range), a ridge in the Fichtelgebirge Mountains in Bavaria, Germany
Mount Waldstein, an 8,579 ft mountain in the Absaroka Range of Montana
House of Waldstein, a noble family from Bohemia
The Waldstein Sonata, a popular name for Beethoven's Piano Sonata No. 21

People with the surname
Albrecht von Wallenstein (1583-1634), talented Bohemian military commander and powerful politician 
Franz de Paula Adam von Waldstein (1759-1823), Austrian soldier, explorer and naturalist
Count Ferdinand Ernst Gabriel von Waldstein (1762-1823), Austrian nobleman, patron of Beethoven
Charles Waldstein (1856-1927), Anglo-American archaeologist and U.S. Olympic shooter
 Felix Waldstein (1862-1943), German politician

See also 
Wok of Waldstein a notable figure among the Hussites of Prague in the 15th century
Waldstein Castle, a ruined castle in Baden-Württemberg, Germany
Großer Waldstein, a mountain in province of Upper Franconia in Bavaria, Germany
 Wald (disambiguation)

German-language surnames